Emozamia licina is a species of sea snail, a marine gastropod mollusk, in the family Muricidae, the murex snails or rock snails.

Distribution
This species occurs in the following locations:
 Australian Exclusive Economic Zone
 Japanese Exclusive Economic Zone
 New Zealand Exclusive Economic Zone

References

licina
Gastropods described in 1906